Nusle Bridge is a prestressed concrete viaduct in Prague, Czech Republic. It connects Prague 2 and Prague 4, across a valley which forms part of the Nusle district. The bridge is one of the longest in the country and carries two footpaths, a multi-lane road and part of the city's rapid transit network.

The bridge links the city center to its south-eastern districts such as Pankrác, and joins the D1 motorway leading to Brno. It is crucial to Prague's transportation network, since almost all north-south traffic flows across it. Below the six-lane highway on the surface, lies part of Prague Metro Line C between I.P. Pavlova and Vyšehrad stations.

Description

The bridge is 485 metres long and 26.5 metres wide, consisting of a reinforced concrete structure with four pillars. Two sections of the bridge span 68.5m and the other three span 115.5m. The average height above the valley is 42.5m. The conduit for the metro line C has a trapezoidal cross section, with a height of almost 6.5 m and wall thickness from 30 to 110 cm. The road is illuminated by lamps mounted in the central reservation.

Position

The bridge crosses, inter alia, Folimanka Park, Botič stream and the railway line from Prague main station to Smíchov. The majority of the bridge belongs to the administrative district of Prague 2. The section which lies to the south of the railway track below, however, belongs to Prague 4.

History

Construction began in 1967 and it opened on 22 February 1973 under the name Klement Gottwald Bridge (Czech: Most Klementa Gottwalda), honouring the late communist revolutionary and former president Klement Gottwald.

Suicides

A total of 200 to 300 people have been recorded to have taken their own life by jumping from the bridge, garnering the nickname "Suicide bridge". Since 2011, the deceased have been commemorated in the monument named Of One's Own Volition by Krištof Kintera, in the park below.

The original safety railing was 1m high. In 1990, a 1.5m wide net was hung underneath the railing. Between 1996 and 1997, further fencing was added, heightening the barrier to 2.7 m. In 2007, the fencing was topped off with another meter of polished metal to make it near-impossible to climb.

References

External links 
 

Viaducts
Bridges completed in 1973
Bridges in Prague